Tri-kāṇḍī ("Three books") is a Sanskrit-language work on the philosophy of language and grammar (vyakarana), written by the 5th-century grammarian Bhartṛ-hari in present-day India. Some 19th-20th century printed editions refer to it by the title Vākya-padiya, which is actually the title of a part of it.

Contents 

Trikāṇḍī comprises three books (kāṇḍas):

 Agama-samuchchaya ("Collection of traditionally received knowledge") or Brahma-kāṇḍa
 Vākya-padiya or Vākya-kāṇḍa
 Prakirna(ka) ("Miscellany") or Pada-kāṇḍa

The alternative titles - Brahma-kāṇḍa, Vakyā-kāṇḍa, and Pada-kāṇḍa - likely do not originate from the author.

The early printed editions of the work, such as those from 1888 and 1905, incorrectly presented Vākya-padiya as the title of the entire collection containing three books. Vākya-padiya originally referred only to the second book of the collection, and later came to refer to the first two books. The term "Vākya-padiya" likely referred to the first two books by time of Vṛṣabha (c. 650), and definitely in the time of Hela-raja (c. 980) and Vardhamana (the author of Gana-ratna-mahodadhi, c. 1140).

The first two parts are divided into kārikās (verses) and vṛtti (commentary). Since the earliest times, tradition attributes the authorship of the vṛttis to Bhartṛ-hari himself, although some manuscripts name Hari-vṛṣabha alias Vṛṣabha as their author.

Scholar Ashok Aklujkar theorizes that Bhartṛ-hari originally conceived the three books as "relatively independent" treatises, but later thought of unifying them into a single work. However, he died after composing commentaries (vṛtti) on the first two books. Dharma-pala (6th century) wrote the vṛtti on the third book.

Book 1: Agama-samuchchaya 

The Book I discusses the concept of Brahman, stating that it "creates the diversity of the world out of language". It briefly discusses the Vedic branches and the Vedas as a source of rites, smṛti, schools of philosophy, and traditional knowledge. The author highlights the importance of the grammar (vyakarana), calling it "the door to liberation", and describing it as the first among the six auxiliary sciences, because other sciences can be understood only through it.

The text then discusses various topics, including words, meanings, and the relationship between them; the scope of grammar; linguistic forms; sphota; cognizance of the sound, etc. The author states that children understand language because of "dispositional tendencies" from their previous births; they attempt to speak out of intuition, not because they are taught to speak. In the vrtti, the author explains that something that exists is as good as non-existent unless spoken of using language; similarly, non-existent things become as good as real when language brings them to one's mind.

The author describes language as the basis of all branches of knowledge, and of all arts and crafts. He discusses the relationship between language and other concepts, such as cognition, consciousness, merit, spirituality, and scriptures. He also discusses the use of incorrect linguistic forms (apabhramsha).

Book 2: Vākya-padiya

The author lists various definitions of a sentence by different authorities, such as Katyayana, the Mimamsa school, and different logicians (nyaya-vadins). He then discusses the concept of sphota, and various views regarding the divisibility and indivisibility of a sentence and its meaning.

The author discusses 12 views regarding the meaning of linguistic forms. He lists six varieties of intuition, and discusses the role of intuition in understanding the meaning of a sentence. He then discusses constituents of words (such as prefix, suffix, stem, and roots); linguistic forms (nouns, verbs, prepositions, particles, and postpositions); phonemes; compound words; homophones; concatenations of words etc.

The author states that one must distinguish between the possible and intended meanings of the linguistic forms, and discusses various factors that determine the meaning. He also discusses various views on the relationship between language and meaning. For example, some people think that language only produces a memory, it does not establish the meaning: a burned man understands the meaning of burning when he comes in contact with fire, as opposed to learning the meaning of the word "burning" through language. The author also discusses other related topics, such as completeness of a sentence, emphasis etc.

In the epilogue, the author talks about different grammar traditions of India, stating that his teacher had mastered all of them. He mentions several earlier scholars, including Panini, Patanjali, Chandra, Baiji, Saubhava, and Haryaska. He states that it is important to learn about various traditions and the works of earlier scholars.

Book 3: Prakirna(ka) 

Book 3 comprises 14 chapters (samuddeśas):

 On Universal Property (Jāti-samuddeśa)
 On Substance (Dravya-samuddeśa)
 On Relation (Saṃbandha-parīkṣā)
 More on Substance (Bhūyodravya-samuddeśa)
 On Quality (Guṇa-samuddeśa)
 On Spatial Direction (Dik-samuddeśa)
 On the Means to Action (Sādhana-samuddeêa)
 On Action (Kriyā-samuddeśa)
 On Time (Kāla-samuddeśa)
 On Person (Puruṣa-samuddeśa)
 On Number (Saṃkhyā-samuddeśa)
 On Aspect (Upa-graha-samuddeśa)
 On Gender (Liṅga-samuddeśa)
 On Linguistic Formations (Vṛtti-samuddeśa)

Commentaries 

The following commentaries of the work are known:

Book 1

 Original, longer vritti by Bhartṛ-hari or Hari-vṛṣabha
 Shorter vritti by an unknown redactor
 Paddhati or Sphutakshara, a tika by Vṛṣabha-deva. Hari-vṛṣabha alias Vṛṣabha (c. 650 CE) was a son of Deva-yashas and a protege of king Vishnu-gupta; his Vakyapadiya-paddhati is the earliest known commentary on Bhartṛ-hari's work, composed by someone other than Bhartṛ-hari.

Book 2

 Original vritti by Bhartṛ-hari or Hari-vṛṣabha
 A tika, probably titled Vakya-pradipa, by Punya-raja or Rajanaka-shura-varman; this work contains an explanation of the kārikās
 A summary in verses of the tika by Punya-raja or Rajanaka-shura-varman; this was likely a summary of a now-lost commentary by Hela-raja
 Vākya-padiya-prameya-samgraha, a summary of the tika, by an unknown redactor

Book 3

 Prakirna-vrtti by the Yogachara teacher Dhrama-pala (6th-7th century); this work is now lost, and is known from the Chinese tradition and I-tsing. The title Prakirna-vrtti is known from Durveka Mishra's Dharmottara-pradipa.
 Prakirna[ka]-prakasha by Hela-raja, with two gaps filled by Phulla-raja (likely same as Punya-raja); this work contains an explanation of the kārikās

Editions 

 1887: Gangadhara-shastri Manavalli's edition containing
 the kārikās and shorter vṛtti of the first book
 the kārikās and tika of the second book
 1934: Charu-deva Shastri's edition containing
 the kārikās nad the longer vṛtti of the first book
 excerpts from Vṛṣabha's tika
 1935: K. Samba-shiva-shastri's edition of chapters 8-13 of the third book and Hela-raja's commentary on these
 1941: Charu-deva Shastri's incomplete edition of the kārikās and vṛtti of the second book
 1942: L.A. Ravi Varma's edition of hcapter 14 of the third bok and Hela-raja's tika on it
 K.A. Subramania Iyer's editions, with English translations
 1963: chapters 1-7 of the third book and Hela-raja's commentary on these
 1966: Complete text of Vṛṣabha's tika' to the first book
 1973: Chapters 8-14 of the third book and Hela-raja's tika on these
 1977: Wilhelm Rau's edition of the kārikās'' of the three books

Notes

References

Bibliography 

 
 

Ancient Indian grammar works
Sanskrit texts
5th-century books